The Shire of Yarra Ranges, also known as Yarra Ranges Council, is a local government area in Victoria, Australia, located in the outer eastern and northeastern suburbs of Melbourne extending into the Yarra Valley and Dandenong Ranges. In June 2018, it had a population of 158,173.

It was formed in 1994 by the merger of parts of the Shire of Sherbrooke, Shire of Lillydale, Shire of Healesville and Shire of Upper Yarra.

History
Prior to European settlement, the land within and beyond the Yarra Ranges was occupied by the Wurundjeri people.

European settlement was established from the 1830s with settlers engaging in agriculture and gold mining activities.

Council 
Yarra Ranges is divided into nine wards, each of which elects one councillor for a period of four years. The next election will take place during October 2020.

Wards 
 Billanook Ward, named after the Wurundjeri name for the region and pioneered by explorer Robert Hoddle
 Chandler Ward, named after a pioneering family
 Chirnside Ward, named after George Chirnside, a Mooroolbark settler and owner of the Werribee Park Mansion
 Lyster Ward, named after William Saurin Lyster, an impresario who had a dairy farm in the area
 Melba Ward, named after opera singer Dame Nellie Melba
 O'Shannassy Ward, named after O'Shannassy River and reservoir, in turn named after John O'Shanassy (sic.), Premier of Victoria in the mid-1800s
 Ryrie Ward, named after William Ryrie who planted the first vineyards in the area
 Streeton Ward, named after Sir Arthur Streeton, a painter who lived in Olinda
 Walling Ward, named after landscape designer Edna Walling

Current composition

Townships and localities
The 2021 census, the shire had a population of 156,068 up from 149,537 in the 2016 census

^ - Territory divided with another LGA

Major thoroughfares

 Burwood Highway (State Route 26)
 Canterbury Road/Swansea Road/Anderson Street (south) (State Route 32 / C401) (briefly merges with C415 before turning to SR32 (and SR22 respectively))
 Maroondah Highway (State Route 34 / B300)
 Belgrave-Hallam Road/Monbulk Road/Hereford Road (C404) (briefly merges with C406)
 Belgrave Road (State Route 26)
 Olinda-Monbulk Road/Emerald Monbulk Road
 Warburton Highway (B380)
 Healesville- Koo Wee Rup Road (C411)
 Mount Dandenong (Tourist) Road (State Route 22 / C415)

Notes

References

External links
 
Official website
Community profile at .id.com.au
Public transport map at PTV

Local government areas of Melbourne
Greater Melbourne (region)
 
Yarra Valley